The Journal of California and Great Basin Anthropology is a leading regional source of scholarly information on the ethnography, archaeology, linguistics, and Native American history of the Western United States created by Harry Lawton.

It is published by Malki Museum Press, based on the Morongo Indian Reservation in Banning, California.

Begun in 1974 as the Journal of California Anthropology, it expanded its scope and changed to its present name in 1979. It has usually published two issues per year.

The journal's editors have included:
 Michael Kearney (1974–1976)
 Philip J. Wilke (1977–1980, 1986–1990)
 Harry W. Lawton (1980)
 Matthew C. Hall (1980–1985)
 Michael K. Lerch (1985)
 Mark Q. Sutton (1986–1989, 1991–2000)
 Jill Gardner (1998–2000)
 Paul Apodaca (2001–2004)
 Lynn H. Gamble (2005–2010)
 Todd Braje (2011–2012)
 Bill Hildebrandt (2013– )

External links
Journal of California and Great Basin Anthropology

Older issues of the journal are freely available through the University of California's e-Scholarship repository:

Journal of California Anthropology, Vol. 1 (1974) through Vol. 5 (1978)
Journal of California and Great Basin Anthropology, Vol. 1 (1979) through Vol. 36 (2016)

Anthropology journals
Journal
Journal
Journal
Journal
Journal
A
Banning, California
1974 establishments in California